An annular solar eclipse will occur on November 5, 2059. A solar eclipse occurs when the Moon passes between Earth and the Sun, thereby totally or partly obscuring the image of the Sun for a viewer on Earth. An annular solar eclipse occurs when the Moon's apparent diameter is smaller than the Sun's, blocking most of the Sun's light and causing the Sun to look like an annulus (ring). An annular eclipse appears as a partial eclipse over a region of the Earth thousands of kilometres wide. The Sun will be 94% covered in a moderate annular eclipse, lasting 7 minutes exactly and covering a broad path up to 238 km wide.

Related eclipses

Solar eclipses 2059–2061

Saros 134

Metonic cycle

References

External links 
 http://eclipse.gsfc.nasa.gov/SEplot/SEplot2051/SE2059Nov05A.GIF

2059 11 5
2059 in science
2059 11 5
2059 11 5